The Christian National Party (Partido Nacional Cristiano) is a Christian democratic political party in Colombia. 
At the last legislative elections, 10 March 2002, the party, as one of the many small parties, won parliamentary representation. 

Christian democratic parties in South America
Christian political parties
Conservative parties in Colombia
Christian democratic parties in Colombia